Centaurea nicaeensis is a plant species in the family Asteraceae.

Sources

References 

nicaeensis
Flora of Malta